The Mindanao mountain rat or long-tailed moss mouse (Limnomys sibuanus), is a species of rodent in the family Muridae. It is found only in the Philippines, where it is present at high altitudes in the Kitanglad Mountain Range on the island of Mindanao.

Taxonomy
Limnomys sibuanus was first described in 1905 by the American naturalist Edgar Alexander Mearns. It was based on a single individual and limited in its scope. In 1913, the biologist Ned Hollister described a second species in the genus, L. mearnsii, from a number of specimens, but this was later synonymised with L. sibuanus. Another species was described in 2003 by Eric A. Rickart as Limnomys bryophilus. The new species had a "relatively longer tail, larger hind feet, softer pelage with grayish-white ventral coloration, larger skull with a longer rostrum, larger auditory bullae, larger molars, and other [distinguishing] cranial and dental features." Both species are endemic to the Kitanglad Mountain Range in central Mindanao in the Philippines, but they differ in the elevations at which they are found.

Description
The fur is short and somewhat coarse with flattened awns. The upper parts of this rat are yellowish-brown and the underparts are plain white, with no brown on the chest. The pinnae and the hind feet are smaller than those of L. bryophilus. Its karyotype has 2n = 42 and FN = 61/62.

Distribution and habitat
The species is native to the Kitanglad Mountain Range in Mindanao where it occurs on Mount Apo, Mount Kitanglad and Mount Malindang.

Status
L. sibuanus has a limited range but it is a common species in the tropical high altitude rainforest and moss forest; the whole mountain range is included in the Mount Kitanglad Range Natural Park, which was designated a protected area in 2000. The habitat is not being exploited and no particular threats to this species are known, so the International Union for Conservation of Nature has assessed its conservation status as being of "least concern".

References

Limnomys
Rats of Asia
Endemic fauna of the Philippines
Rodents of the Philippines
Fauna of Mindanao
Mammals described in 1905
Taxa named by Edgar Alexander Mearns
Taxonomy articles created by Polbot